The Mitong is a river of Sivasagar District, Assam, India. It is a tributary of the Jhanji River.

References

Rivers of Assam
Sivasagar district
Rivers of India